Jabłkowo  is a village in the administrative district of Gmina Skoki, within Wągrowiec County, Greater Poland Voivodeship, in west-central Poland.

The village has a church which lies on the Wooden Churches Trail around Puszcza Zielonka.

On 1 V 1925 the Roman Catholic parish in Jabłkowo was restored.

References

Villages in Wągrowiec County